Grayson is a village in the Canadian province of Saskatchewan within the Rural Municipality of Grayson No. 184 and Census Division No. 5.

History 
Grayson incorporated as a village on April 19, 1906. Grayson celebrated its 100th anniversary in 2006.

Demographics 

Economy

Like many small Saskatchewan communities, Grayson was built along a railway which no longer exists. It no longer has a grain elevator, but a few unique businesses and its proximity to Melville allow it to prosper, particularly a meat plant (source of the famous 'Grayson Sausage').

Grayson also possesses a post office, modern grocery/cafe, hardware store, plumbers, tavern, elementary school, village and Rural Municipality offices, business services and computer technical services. There is also a dance hall, a seniors centre, and apartments for rent. Until 2017, when the Saskatchewan Transportation Company was discontinued, it had a bus drop-off and pickup.

See also 

 List of communities in Saskatchewan
 Villages of Saskatchewan

References

Villages in Saskatchewan
Grayson No. 184, Saskatchewan
Division No. 5, Saskatchewan